Strapping, also known as bundling and banding, is the process of applying a strap to an item to combine, stabilize, hold, reinforce, or fasten it. The strap may also be referred to as strapping. Strapping is most commonly used in the packaging industry.

Types of strap
Strap is a flexible flat material, most commonly made from steel or various plastics.

Steel

Steel is the oldest and highest tensile strength strapping. It is available in a variety of widths and thicknesses as well as variations in the grade of steel. Steel is used for heavy duty holding where high strength and minimal stretch are desired. Surface finishes for steel strap include: paint, paint and wax, bluing or zinc and wax. The wax is used to better transmit the tension around the bundle and for use with certain types of tensioners. Common applications include steel coils, bundles of metal, baling wire, bricks and pavers, and roll end-binding. Steel Strapping is sold by weight rather than length, due to the natural expansion and contraction of steel in the manufacturing process. A 3/4 x .020 Steel Strapping Coil yields approximately 19.6 feet per pound.

Polypropylene
Polypropylene strap (oriented or ) is an economical material designed for light to medium duty unitizing, palletizing and bundling. It is available in various widths, thicknesses, and polymer variations (e.g., copolymers). Most polypropylene is embossed, some of which is also printed. This product offers higher elongation at break but tends to have irrecoverable dead stretch with constant stress.
What is not generally known to end users is that polypropylene strapping will lose about 50% of the applied tension within one hour, and that this tension loss is accelerated with increases in ambient temperature, consequently although suitable for packs with a degree of stored energy that will take up any relaxation that occurs in the strap, unacceptable strap slackness may occur after time if used on product that is 'Solid' such as bricks or concrete.  Furthermore polypropylene strapping is susceptible to UV degradation and can quickly degrade if left outside exposed to the elements.  The sensible choice of colour will retard the process, such as specifying black strap.  Similarly, a UV inhibitor can be specified.

Polypropylene strapping may be printed, either during production and pre-embossing for the highest quality and precision, or post production over the embossing for a reduced quality.  Both offer security and marketing advantages to the strapped product.

Polyester
Oriented or  polyester and nylon are the strongest plastic strapping products and are used as a viable alternative to steel strapping in some industries. Polyester provides excellent retained tension on rigid loads. Its excellent recovery properties help a load absorb impact without strap breakage.

There are specialized types available for specific applications. For instance, in cold climates a strap bonded in hot melt glue is used because it is weather-proof.

Nylon
Nylon strap has the greatest specific strength of the three plastics, however it is rarely used due to its high price. In the past nylon strap used to be very popular, but over time polyester has replaced almost all of its use. One application that still uses this type of strap is cold room applications, because it does not creep as much as the other types of plastic.

Corded and woven
Corded and woven strapping are available in several constructions, primarily involving polyester and rayon. Some types are reusable. Because this system uses a buckle for a joint, corded and woven strapping can have a larger system strength than steel banding. Corded polyester strapping also has a higher elongation than other strapping systems, which gives it an ideal memory for sea and rail shipments. Because corded and woven polyester straps are light and soft, they are also a safer alternative to steel banding.

Paper
Paper strap is used to strap paper products between industrial processes. This allows the bundle to be introduced into the process without the need to cut the straps, which can lead to the product falling apart prematurely.

Composite
Composite strapping has polyester filaments embedded longitudinally down the length of the strap that provides the tensile strength.  These polyester yarn fibers are embedded within a polypropylene coating.  The polypropylene provides foam to the strap but also improves the non-slip characteristic when combined with the wire buckle.  In the load securing industry it is often referred to as “synthetic steel”. It is very abrasion resistant and has the highest joint efficiency when used with a buckle. Both advantages are not affected by climate.

Uses of strapping
Examples include:
Bundling items together for handling and shipment: newspapers, pipe, lumber, concrete block, etc.
Attaching items to pallets, skids, and crates
Reinforcing wooden boxes, crates, and corrugated boxes, such as gaylords
Attaching items to flatcars, flatbed semi-trailers,
Securing a unit load of bricks, packaged glass, metal parts, etc.
Closing corrugated boxes and shipping containers
Securing coils of steel or paper
Holding bales of agricultural products or textiles
Load securing items within intermodal containers, boxcars, and semi-trailers

Strapping is most often used in complete horizontal or vertical bands.  Edge protectors are used to help spread the load at corners and reduce damage to the load by the tensioned strap. Strapping can also be used in loops attached to holding locations on rail cars, skids, etc.

Joining methods
After the strap is tensioned, the strap is often sealed to itself. Steel strap is sealed with a seal and notch joint, a seal and crimp, seal-less joint, or via welding. Seals come in various shapes depending on the application; some can be put on after the strap is tensioned, while others must be installed before tensioning. To create the seal, the seal and strap are notched on both sides; if one set of notches are created then it is called a single notch joint, if two sets of notches are created then it is called a double notch joint. Crimp joints also use a seal, but crimp undulations are used instead of formed notches. These crimps form great frictional forces which keep the joint from seeping. Seal-less joints are created by forming interlocking keys into the middle of the strap.

Plastic strap is most commonly joined by melting the straps together by adding heat to the joint. For lighter gauge strap, usually  and narrower, heat is introduced with a hot knife system. First, the hot knife moves in between the straps. Then a platen comes up and compresses the straps and hot knife against an anvil on the order of tens of milliseconds. The platen then drops and the hot knife is removed. After the hot knife is completely clear of the straps the platen comes back up and compresses the joint so that the melted portions of the strap mix and harden.

For thicker plastic strap, usually  and thicker, friction is used to create heat within the joint. The process starts with the strap compressed between the platen and the anvil. There is a vibrator built into either the platen or the anvil, which has teeth; there are also teeth on the opposite component that does not move. The vibrator is quickly vibrated, which creates enough heat to melt the interface between the two strap, because of friction. To complete the weld the vibrator is stopped and the pressure held until the joint has solidified. Polypropylene and Polyester strapping can also be sealed in a similar manner with the heat being produced by sound in the form of Ultrasonic waves passing through the materials and exiting the molecular structure. They are then compressed as in a heat seal. In ultrasonic welding of plastics, high frequency (15 kHz to 40 kHz ) low amplitude vibration is used to create heat by way of friction between the materials to be joined. The interface of the two parts is specially designed to concentrate the energy for the maximum weld strength.

It may also be joined manually by crimping a seal or via a buckle.

The joint is the weakest part of the system, therefore the type of joining method used is very important if strength is an issue. The strength of a joint is defined as the force required to break the strap in uniaxial tension. Hot knife welds have a minimum break strength of 55%. Friction welds have a minimum break strength of 65%. Well set up strapping machines or friction weld tools will aim for around 80% of break strength. Metal clips/seals are surprisingly low with circa 100 – 120 kg slip resistance.

For pallets strapping based on norm ASTM D3953 Standard Specification, the number of the strapping procedure is around 10 times for a minimal.

Equipment

There are two major types of equipment available for strapping: hand tools and strapping machines or banding machines. A dispenser is used with both types of equipment to dispense the strap. Some strapping machines have the dispenser built-in, others (typically those on large arch machines) have a separately powered dispenser, which can automatically load or thread new coils. Non-powered separated dispensers have a pulley which releases and activates a brake to stop the inertia of the coil to keep the strap from over-running onto the floor. Typically dispensers used on large arch strapping machines have multiple pulleys to act as a way to store strap in a way that can be quickly dispensed. Smaller arch machines such as tabletop machines will feed strap into a pool box/accumulator instead. In both cases this is required otherwise the strapping machine will draw the strap faster than the dispenser can pay off.

Within hand tools, there are manual and automatic tools. Manual tensioners and crimping systems are available for low volume applications. Automatic hand tools are used for higher volume applications. Automatic tools are available using a battery power source or compressed air. Both manual and automatic tools are available as combination tools, which perform the tensioning, sealing and cutting, or as separate tensioners, sealers, and cutters. Manual sealers for plastic strap always use a seal and a compression (serrated seals) or crimp joint (smooth-faced seals). Manual and automatic hand sealers for steel can use a seal or a seal-less joint. Automatic hand tools for plastic strap use a friction weld.

Strapping machines, also known as bundlers or banders, are used for higher volume applications or special applications. They are available in horizontal and vertical orientations, however the vertical orientation is far more common. They are also available in bottom seal, side seal, and top seal orientations, which define where the joint is located on the bundle. They are available in semi-automatic and automatic varieties. The automatic versions can additionally to be used inline with conveyor systems. A photocell is used to detect when the bundle is in the correct location, stop the conveyors, and activate the strapping machine.  Most however will be found in standalone applications.

Degree of automation

Strapping Machines 
Semi-automatic and fully automatic strapping machines substantially improve efficiency in a warehouse and also the overall presentation of your packaged product. The labour-saving can often easily cover the relatively low cost of the strapping machine.

Both semi and fully automatic strapping machines can easily be included in a packing production line where packing tables and strapping machines are positioned at workable heights.

Banding Machines 

Banding machines like strapping machines allow the unitization and securing of products with a variety of different shapes and sizes. 

Banding machines, however, are less damaging to the product being strapped, since the larger widths of bands available (20mm - 100mm) allow greater surface area that minimizes the harm on sensitive products. Banding machines can also run on paper straps for a more eco-friendly alternative to plastic strapping. 

Operation is by photo-sensor, foot pedal, or a PLC, allowing these machines to be integrated into production lines or for standalone operation.

Automatic Strapping Machines 
Automatic strapping machines allow hands-free securing of parcels with automatically tensioned, sealed and cut polypropylene strapping. 

Operation is either by a foot pedal or parcel sensor making these machines ideal for volume throughput.

Semi-Automatic Strapping Machines 
Semi-automatic strapping machines will allow one operator to automatically tension, seal and cut polypropylene strapping to give neat and secure fastening on any size box. 

Adjustable strap tensioning to suit each package prevents strap damage to softer boxes.

See also
Cable tie

References

Further reading
 Yam, K. L., "Encyclopedia of Packaging Technology", John Wiley & Sons, 2009, 
 Wulftec International

Standards
ASTM D3953 Standard Specification for Strapping, Flat Steel and Seals
ASTM D3950 Standard Specification for Strapping, Nonmetallic (and Joining Methods)
ASTM D4675 Standard Guide for Selection and Use of Flat Strapping Materials
BS EN13891:2003  Tensional Strapping - Guide to selection and use of tensional strapping
BS EN13394:2001  Packaging Specification for non-metallic strapping

Packaging materials